Liam Wright (born 6 November 1997) is an Australian professional rugby union player who captains the Queensland Reds in Super Rugby. His usual position is flanker. He has been capped for Australia at international rugby.

Career
Wright began his senior rugby career with Easts Tigers, playing Queensland Premier Rugby in 2016. He was selected in the Australian Under-20 team in 2016 and 2017 for the World Championships in Italy and Georgia.

In 2017, he signed a two-year professional contract with the Queensland Reds for the following two seasons. After impressing national selectors during the NRC in 2017, Wright played for  against the Barbarians in Sydney, and was then chosen as one of two development players in the Wallabies tour squad for the 2017 end-of-year rugby union internationals.

Wright made his Super Rugby debut for the Reds off the bench in the team's first match of the 2018 season, playing against the Rebels in Melbourne.

He was selected in the Australian national squad for the Bledisloe Cup in 2019, and made his test debut against New Zealand at Eden Park in August that year.

References

External links
 Stats on It's Rugby

1997 births
Australia international rugby union players
Australian rugby union players
Queensland Country (NRC team) players
Rugby union flankers
Sportsmen from Queensland
Living people
Queensland Reds players
Rugby union players from Durban
21st-century Australian people